M.N.R. Balan is an Indian politician who served as Deputy Speaker of 14th Puducherry Assembly and Member of 14th Puducherry Assembly from Ozhukarai Assembly constituency. He is the son-in law of R. V. Janakiraman.

References 

Deputy Speakers of Puducherry Legislative Assembly
Puducherry MLAs 2016–2021
Indian National Congress politicians from Puducherry
Living people
Year of birth missing (living people)